The 2019 AFF U-15 Championship was the fourteenth edition of the AFF U-16 Championship (second edition of the under-15 era), the annual international youth association football championship organised by the ASEAN Football Federation for men's under-15 national teams of Southeast Asia.

A total of 12 teams played in the tournament, with players born on or after 1 January 2004 eligible to participate. Each match had a duration of 80 minutes, consisting of two halves of 40 minutes.

Malaysia beat Thailand 2–1 in the final for their second title in the championship.

Qualified teams 
There was no qualification, and all entrants advanced to the final tournament.
The following 12 teams from member associations of the ASEAN Football Federation entered the tournament.

{| class="wikitable sortable"
|-
! style="width:140px;"|Team
! style="width:120px;"|Association
! style="width:75px;"|Appearance
!Previous best performance
|-
| 
| Vietnam FF
| 11th
| Winners (2006, 2010, 2017)
|-
| 
| FA Thailand
| 10th
| Winners (2007, 2011, 2015)
|-
| 
| FF Australia
| 7th
| Winners (2008, 2016)
|-
| 
| Myanmar FF
| 11th
| Winners (2002, 2005)|-
| 
| FA Indonesia
| 10th
| Winners (2018)
|-
| 
| FA Malaysia
| 11th
| Winners (2013)
|-
| 
| Lao FF
| 10th
| Runners-up (2002, 2007, 2011)
|-
| 
| FF Timor-Leste
| 7th
| Third place (2010)
|-
| 
| FA Singapore
| 10th
| Fourth place (2008, 2011)
|-
| 
| FF Cambodia
| 10th
| Fourth place (2016)
|-
| 
| Philippine FF
| 8th
| Group stage (2002, 2011, 2013, 2015, 2016, 2017, 2018)
|-
| 
| FA Brunei DS
| 8th
| Group stage (2002, 2007, 2013, 2015, 2016, 2017, 2018)
|}

 Venues 
The competition is being played at two venues in Chonburi, Chonburi Province: Chonburi Campus Stadium and Chonburi Stadium (in Mueang Chonburi).

 Officials Referees  Abdul Hakim Mohd Haidi (Brunei)
  Chy Samdy (Cambodia)
  Khoun Virak (Cambodia)
  Yudi Nurcahya (Indonesia)
  Khamsing Xaiyavongsy (Laos)
  Kyaw Zwall Lwin (Myanmar)
  Soe Lin Aung (Myanmar)
  Linjun Talaver (Philippines)
  Steve Supresencia (Philippines)
  Songkran Bunmeekiart (Thailand)
  Torpong Somsing (Thailand)
  Trường Hồng Vũ (Vietnam)Assistant referees'''
  Sun Daravuth (Cambodia)
  Beni Andriko (Indonesia)
  I Gede Selamet Raharja (Indonesia)
  Phonesooksin Teso (Laos)
  Somphavanh Louanglath (Laos)
  Mohd Hariff Md Akhir (Malaysia)
  Hein Min Tun (Myanmar)
  Zayar Maung (Myanmar)
  Giovanni Lachica (Philippines)
  Chotrawee Tongduang (Thailand)
  Poonsawat Samransuk (Thailand)
  Phạm Hoài Tâm (Vietnam)

Draw

Group stage 
The top two teams of each group advance to the semi-finals.

Tiebreakers
The teams are ranked according to points (3 points for a win, 1 point for a draw, 0 points for a loss). If tied on points, tiebreakers are applied in the following order:
 Goal difference in all the group matches;
 Greater number of goals scored in all the group matches;
 Result of the direct match between the teams concerned;
 Kicks  from the penalty mark if the teams concerned are still on the field of play.
 Lowest score using Fair Play Criteria;
 Drawing of lots.
 All matches held in Thailand.
 All times are local, UTC+7.

Group A

Group B

Knockout stage 
In the knockout stage, the penalty shoot-outs are used to decide the winner if necessary (extra time is not used).

Bracket

Semi-finals

Third place match

Final

Winner

Awards

Goalscorers

Final ranking

Incidents and controversies 
On 29 July 2019, the ASEAN Football Federation (AFF) received official protest from two participating teams regarding the eligibility of an East Timorese player in the ongoing tournament. The protest was subsequently admitted upon compliance of the procedural requirements set out in the 2019 Tournament Regulations with the AFF began to carrying out the necessary investigation and have requested the parties involved to collaborate to establish the facts. On 3 August, the AFF further stated that the  relevant documents requested from the player and his team have been delivered and acknowledged by the AFF secretariat. In accordance to the tournament regulations, the conclusion of the investigation will be decided by the AFF Disciplinary and Ethics Committee. On 4 August, the AFF announced their findings that the said player is deemed to be eligible to participate in the tournament in accordance with Article 5.1 as stated in the tournament regulations and ruled the protest lodged by two countries as unfounded and dismissed it accordingly.

On 9 August, the final match between Thailand and Malaysia was marred with ugly incident that resulted in Thai player Kongpop Sroirak and Malaysian player Khairil Zain being both issued a red card.

References

External links 
  at ASEAN Football Federation official website.

2019
2019 in AFF football
2019 in youth association football
International association football competitions hosted by Thailand